The Ven. Robert Hodgson (b Hoxne 11 July 1844 - d Lichfield 29 January 1917) was Archdeacon of Stafford from 1898 to 1910.

Hodgson was educated at Eton and Oriel College, Oxford and ordained in 1869.

After a curacy in Stoke-upon-Trent he held incumbencies at West Bromwich, Walsall and Handsworth. In 1907 he became a residentiary canon at Lichfield Cathedral.

Notes

1844 births
People from Hoxne
People educated at Eton College
Alumni of Oriel College, Oxford
Archdeacons of Stafford
1917 deaths